Pinheiros is a district in the city of São Paulo, Brazil.

Pinheiros may also refer to:

In São Paulo
Subprefecture of Pinheiros
Pinheiros (CPTM), a railway station
Pinheiros (São Paulo Metro), a ViaQuatro railway station
Pinheiros River, a river that flows through the city
Esporte Clube Pinheiros, a multi-sports and social club
Esporte Clube Pinheiros (basketball)
Esporte Clube Pinheiros (handball)
Esporte Clube Pinheiros (women's volleyball)

Elsewhere in Brazil
Pinheiros, Espírito Santo, a municipality
Morro dos Pinheiros, a neighborhood in Teresópolis
Esporte Clube Pinheiros (PR), a football club in Curitiba 1914–1989